Shine On is the second album by Australian rock band Jet, released on 30 September 2006 in Australia and internationally on 2–3 October 2006.

The iTunes Store leaked the album in the Australian and United Kingdom stores on 16 September 2006, two weeks before the official release date. After iTunes leaked the album, Shine On made its way onto file sharing sites through forums of similar bands and people shared that information on Jet's MySpace page.

On 23 September 2006, Triple J premiered the album on its Music Specials show along with interviews with the band. A day later, Nova 100 played the entire album on the radio as a preview.

History
NME first reported in June 2006 that the tracks *"L'esprit D'escalier", "Holiday", "Hey Kids" (for the US version only), "Shiny Magazine", "Eleanor", and "All You Have to Do" were set to appear on the album. "Hey Kids" was released on the Elektra soundtrack but the band liked it so much, they revived it for this album. "Rip It Up" was originally titled "Nothing to Lose", and images of the work in progress lyrics can be viewed in the "Shine On" teaser video that was released in August 2006, along with lyrics for "Don't Worry Baby".

Australian newspaper Herald Sun described the following tracks prior to the release of Shine On:
"All You Have to Do":  	
"Eleanor": "Eleanor" sounds like it's from the '40s.
"King's Horses": There's one track, "King's Horses", which is this nursery rhyme which talks a bit about the bitterness we felt over the past two years.
"Shiny Magazines": And there's "Shiny Magazines" which has the Phil Spector vibe.
"Shine On": The song "Shine On" was written by Nic to comfort his family after his father's death. "It was inevitable I would write a song that dealt with all of that, but it was almost too big a subject for me to handle", Nic says. "Then I got a phone call from my mum saying everyone was fucked so I wrote the song through Dad's eyes, what he would say to help everyone through. We recorded it in one take, but it was fucking emotional, very heavy. We couldn't be happier with this album".

Reception

The album debuted at No. 3 on the Australian ARIA Albums chart the week of 8 October 2006 and became the fiftieth-highest selling album for 2006, and was certified platinum (70,000 units shipped). It also debuted and peaked at No. 13 on the Official UK Top 75 Albums Chart and No. 16 on the Billboard 200, but quickly fell out of the top 100 within four weeks.

As of 2007, the album has sold 137,000 copies in the United States. As of 2012, Shine On and Shaka Rock have sold 212,000 copies combined in the United States.

Critical reaction to the album was mixed. British music magazine NME, for instance, called the record "another joyfully old-fashioned rock 'n' roll album immersed in the classics", while AllMusic gave the album 3.5 stars out of 5 as a solid if undistinguished second effort. In contrast, the American review site Pitchfork posted a review containing only a video clip of a chimpanzee urinating into its own mouth, along with a score of 0.0 out of a possible 10.

Track listing

Charts

Certifications

References

External links
Jet Official website
[ billboard.com]

2006 albums
Albums produced by Dave Sardy
Jet (band) albums
Atlantic Records albums